Bandić Milan 365 – Labour and Solidarity Party ( or BM 365) is a political party in Croatia founded in 2015 by then Mayor of Zagreb Milan Bandić.

History 
The party was founded in Zagreb on 28 March 2015 by then Mayor of Zagreb Milan Bandić and his associates.

In the 2015 parliamentary election, the party participated with 13 coalition partners, won 2 seats in the Croatian Parliament, and eventually signed coalition agreement with the centre-right Patriotic Coalition and Bridge of Independent Lists (MOST), voting in favor of approving Cabinet of Tihomir Orešković. In the 2016 parliamentary election, BM 365 retained 1 MP who voted in favor of approving Cabinet of Andrej Plenković.

Following the death of Milan Bandić on 28 February 2021, the party's vice-president Jelena Pavičić Vukičević became the acting president. On 11 December Slavko Kojić was elected as new president of the party, replacing Pavičić Vukičević.

Election history

Legislative
The following is a summary of the party's results in legislative elections for the Croatian parliament. The "Total votes" and "Percentage" columns include sums of votes won by pre-election coalitions BM 365 had been part of.

European Parliament

Zagreb City Assembly

References

Political parties established in 2015
Social democratic parties in Croatia
2015 establishments in Croatia